Edward Thomas (23 October 1933 – 12 November 2003) was an English footballer who played in the Football League for Blackburn Rovers, Derby County, Everton, Leyton Orient and Swansea Town.

Thomas was signed for Derby by manager Tim Ward, and equalled a club record by scoring in each of his first six games for Derby in 1964.

References

 Sourced from 

English footballers
English Football League players
1933 births
2003 deaths
Everton F.C. players
Blackburn Rovers F.C. players
Swansea City A.F.C. players
Derby County F.C. players
Leyton Orient F.C. players
People from Newton-le-Willows
Association football forwards